Mamunur Rahman Chayan is a former international field hockey player in Bangladesh. He was the captain of the Bangladesh national field hockey team.

References

Living people
Bangladeshi male field hockey players
Field hockey players at the 2006 Asian Games
Field hockey players at the 2010 Asian Games
Field hockey players at the 2014 Asian Games
Field hockey players at the 2018 Asian Games
Year of birth missing (living people)
Asian Games competitors for Bangladesh